Elsmore Township is one of twelve townships in Allen County, Kansas, United States. As of the 2010 census, its population was 414.

Geography
According to the USGS, it contains four cemeteries: Elsmore, Friends Home, Harmony and Old Elsmore.

The streams of Jackie Branch Marmaton River, Little Creek and Mud Creek run through this township.

References
 USGS Geographic Names Information System (GNIS)

External links
 US-Counties.com
 City-Data.com

Townships in Allen County, Kansas
Townships in Kansas